World of Dance Philippines is a Philippine reality competition series based on the similarly named American reality competition. The series will feature dance performers, including solo acts and larger groups, representing any style of dance. A second season has yet to be produced.

Overview
Dubbed as "the biggest dance competition in the world", the Philippine version of the show is part of the World of Dance franchise.

Format
World of Dance is a television series that originated in the United States.

Participants must be at least 8-years-old and above, and is open to both amateur and professional dancers.

Online show
An online show hosted by Maymay Entrata, Riva Quenery and AC Bonifacio titled World of Dance Online is aired simultaneously with the main show.

Season summary

Season 1 (2019)

References

External links
 

ABS-CBN original programming
Dance competition television shows
Philippine reality television series
Philippine television series based on American television series
2019 Philippine television series debuts
Television series by Universal Television
Filipino-language television shows